Injap Tower Hotel is a 21-storey residential building and hotel located in Sen. Benigno Aquino Jr. Avenue, Mandurriao, Iloilo City beside SM City Iloilo. Since its completion in 2013, it has been the tallest building in Iloilo City until 2018, when it was dethroned by the nearby 18-storey high-rise twin tower, SM Strata Tower 1, which is just 9 meters taller. Injap Tower was also the tallest building in the Western Visayas region for the same years. It is the region's tallest hotel, and currently the third tallest building in Iloilo.

The Horizon Café, a restaurant is situated on the top floor of the Injap Tower. The hotel also hosts a spa dubbed as the "Spa Circle".

See also
 List of tallest buildings in the Philippines

 List of tallest buildings in Iloilo

References

Tallest buildings
Residential buildings in the Philippines
Residential buildings completed in 2013
Hotels in the Philippines
21st-century architecture in the Philippines